Ivan Alexandrovich Shefer (born 19 February 1983) is a Russian former competitive ice dancer. With partner Ekaterina Rubleva, he is the 2009 Cup of Russia bronze medalist, the 2004 Bofrost Cup bronze medalist, and a four-time Russian national medalist (2008, 2009 silver; 2007, 2010 bronze).

Personal life 
Ivan Shefer was born in Kirov, Russian SFSR, Soviet Union. He married in April 2010, and his son, Konstantin, was born in August 2010.

Career 
Shefer's parents enrolled him in skating to improve his health. He teamed up with Ekaterina Rubleva in 1994. She was his first and only partner. Rubleva / Shefer began competing internationally in the 2001–2002 season and debuted on the ISU Junior Grand Prix. They placed 5th and 4th at their 2001–2002 ISU Junior Grand Prix events in Sweden and the Czech Republic. At the Russian Championships, they placed 8th on the senior level and 6th on the junior level.

In the 2002–2003 season, Rubleva / Shefer won the silver medal at the 2002–2003 ISU Junior Grand Prix event in China and placed 4th at the event in Germany to qualify for the Junior Grand Prix Final, where they placed 8th. In the 2003–2004 season, they won silver medals at both their events on the 2003–2004 ISU Junior Grand Prix circuit to qualify for the Final. They placed 7th at the Junior Grand Prix Final. They placed 5th on the senior level at the 2004 Russian Championships and then won the bronze medal on the junior level. They were sent to the 2004 Junior Worlds where they placed 6th.

Rubleva / Shefer moved up to the senior level internationally in the 2004–2005 season. They placed 4th at the 2004 Nebelhorn Trophy and won the bronze medal at the 2004 Bofrost Cup on Ice. They placed 5th at the 2005 Russian Championships. They competed at the 2005 Winter Universiade, where they placed 5th.

In the 2005–2006 season, they made their Grand Prix debut, placing 9th at the 2005 Skate America. They placed 6th at the 2006 Russian Championships. They changed coaches in spring 2006, moving from Elena Kustarova to Alexander Svinin and Irina Zhuk.

In 2006–2007, Rubleva / Shefer withdrew from the 2006 Cup of Russia before the start of the event. They won the bronze medal at the 2007 Russian Championships and were assigned to the 2007 European Championships, where they placed 12th in their debut.

In the 2007–2008 season, Rubleva / Shefer placed 8th at the 2007 Skate America and 7th at the 2007 Cup of Russia. They won the silver medal at the 2008 Russian Championships and were sent to the 2008 European Championships, where they placed 13th. They then competed at the 2008 World Championships, where they placed 15th.

In 2008–2009, Rubleva / Shefer placed 6th at the 2008 Skate America and then 7th at the 2008 Trophée Eric Bompard. They won their second consecutive national silver medal at the 2009 Russian Championships and qualified for the 2009 European Championships. At Europeans, Rubleva suffered a wardrobe malfunction during the compulsory dance when a strap on her dress broke and briefly exposed her chest. They placed 8th in their third consecutive appearance at the event. Rubleva / Shefer then competed at the 2009 Winter Universiade, where they won the silver medal, 39 years after Rubleva's parents, Svetlana Bakina / Boris Rublev, had won their Winter Universiade silver medal.

In 2009–2010, they won a Grand Prix medal, bronze at the Cup of Russia. They finished 13th in their second appearance at the World Championships. Rubleva / Shefer retired from competitive skating in August 2010. Shefer began coaching at the Sokolniki rink in Moscow.

Programs 
(with Rubleva)

Competitive highlights 
(with Rubleva)

References

External links 

 
 

Russian male ice dancers
1983 births
Living people
Sportspeople from Kirov, Kirov Oblast
Universiade medalists in figure skating
Universiade silver medalists for Russia
Competitors at the 2009 Winter Universiade
Competitors at the 2005 Winter Universiade